Absence may refer to:

Employment
 Leave of absence, a period of time away from a job
 Absenteeism, the habitual pattern of absence from work or duty
 Absence rate, the ratio of workers with absences to total employees

Sciences and philosophy
 The (local) nonexistence of something
 Absence of evidence, a concept in informal logic
 Absence seizure, one of several kinds of seizures

Arts and entertainment

Music
 The Absence (band), an American death metal band from Tampa, Florida
 Absence (Dälek album), 2004
 Absence (Paper Route album), 2009
 The Absence (Luna Mortis album), 2009 
 The Absence (Melody Gardot album), 2012
 Absence (Snowman album), 2011
 Absence (Terence Blanchard album), 2021

Other media
 Absence (film), a 2014 Brazilian film
The Absence (1976 film), a Canadian drama film
 The Absence (1992 film), a French-German-Spanish drama film
 Absence (audio drama), a Big Finish Productions audio drama
Absent (2011 film), a Spanish-language drama film
 Absent (1928 film), a silent film
 Absence (Una Nemo), a Batman villain

See also

 
 Nothing